Nootdorp is a small town in the Dutch province of South Holland. It is bordered by Zoetermeer to the north, by The Hague (specifically Leidschenveen-Ypenburg) to the west, by Delfgauw to the south and by Pijnacker to the east. Nootdorp was a separate municipality until 2002, when it merged with Pijnacker to form Pijnacker-Nootdorp, which is a part of Greater The Hague.

Nootdorp has a metro station, which Line E runs through, a Rotterdam Metro line connecting The Hague and Rotterdam.

History 
Nootdorp has its roots in the 13th century, it was first mentioned in 1281 as a "safe road" located at what is now known as the Veenweg.

Neighbourhoods
 Oostambacht / Heronpark
 De Venen Oost
 Vrouwtjeslant / Nieuweveen
 De Venen Centrum
 's-Gravenhout
 Nootdorp Centrum/West
 Achter het Raadhuis
 Buitengebied Nootdorp
 De Venen / Craeyenburch

Gallery

Sport
After the formation of the Netherlands national rugby league team, the town formed a rugby league club called the Nootdorp Panthers. They are the first domestic rugby league club in the country that play in the Dutch Rugby League Competition.

Nootdorp has two football clubs, RKDEO and SV Nootdorp.

See also
Nieuweveen

References

External links
Local newspaper online Pijnacker-Nootdorp

Municipalities of the Netherlands disestablished in 2002
Populated places in South Holland
Former municipalities of South Holland
Pijnacker-Nootdorp